Diary of a Madman is a 1963 American horror film directed by Reginald Le Borg and starring Vincent Price, Nancy Kovack, and Chris Warfield.

The screenplay, written by producer Robert Kent, is an adaptation of Guy de Maupassant's short story "Le Horla" ("The Horla"), written in 1887.

Plot

Following the funeral of Simon Cordier (Vincent Price), a French magistrate and amateur sculptor, his secret diary is read out by Simon's pastor friend to a group of people gathered around the table, Simon's servants, and a police captain. The diary reveals that Simon has come into contact with a malevolent entity. The invisible yet corporeal being, called a horla, is capable of limited psychokinesis and complete mind control. It is implied that Cordier's particular horla is one of a whole race of evil beings which devote themselves to driving humans insane.

Cordier first interacts with the horla when he meets a prisoner whom the entity drove to murder four people. The horla possesses the inmate and attempts to kill Cordier, who in self-defense accidentally kills the man. The magistrate inherits the prisoner's troubles as the horla turns its hauntings toward him.

As the horla begins to destroy Cordier's life, he fears he is going mad and seeks help from an alienist, who suggests that he take up a hobby. Cordier chooses to pick up his old interest in sculpture, meeting a model along the way. The model, a local tramp by the name Odette Malotte, is already married. Wanting a better life, she claims to love Cordier and he pledges his love to her in turn. The horla insists the model is not the charming jewel that Cordier sees, but instead a conniving gold-digger, and compels Cordier to treat her as such. This sets up a conflict in Cordier, that he might not be the astute judge of character that his title indicates.

In an episode of insanity, Cordier murders Odette with a knife. Her decapitated body is found in the river, but her husband (not Cordier) is blamed for the crime. As his and others' lives are put in jeopardy, he becomes convinced of the horla's existence and decides drastic measures are needed to end its evil. He lures the horla into his house at night. When his presence is felt, Simon hurls an oil lamp towards the curtains, setting the house ablaze. Simon succeeds in destroying the horla, but not without sacrificing himself as the house burns in flames.

The film concludes with the people seated around the table after reading Simon's diary. Some believe Simon was mad and that the horla does not exist, others are unsure and believe that the horla might have existed. The priest's opinion is that wherever evil exists, the horla exists.

Cast
 Vincent Price as Simon Cordier
 Nancy Kovack as Odette Mallotte DuClasse
 Chris Warfield as Paul DuClasse
 Elaine Devry as Jeanne D'Arville
 Ian Wolfe as Pierre, Cordier's Butler
 Stephen Roberts as Captain Robert Rennedon
 Lewis Martin as Fr. Raymonde
 Mary Adams as Louise, Cordier's Cook
 Joseph Ruskin as The Horla (voice)
 Don Brodie as Marcel the Postman

Production
The movie was originally entitled The Horla. Filming started 18 July 1962.
Director Reginald Le Borg said he wanted the voice of the horla to come out distorted, but producer Edward Small wanted it to sound clear, which the director thought was a mistake.

Release

Home media
The film was released on DVD by Willette Acquisition Corp. on January 15, 2011.

Reception
Critical reception for Diary of a Madman has been mixed. 
The New York Times gave the film a negative review, calling the film, "somewhat less than eye-opening".

References

External links

 
 
 
 

1963 films
1963 horror films
American horror films
1960s English-language films
Films based on multiple works
Films based on short fiction
Films based on works by Guy de Maupassant
Films directed by Reginald Le Borg
Films scored by Richard LaSalle
Films set in country houses
Films set in France
Films set in the 1880s
United Artists films
1960s American films